The Magic Valley Cowboys were a minor league baseball team in the Pioneer League for a total of 17 seasons between 1952 and 1971.  The team was based in Twin Falls, Idaho — the largest city within the Magic Valley region — and succeeded the Twin Falls Cowboys. The team played at Jaycee Field, located in the northeast corner of the city's Harmon Park.

History
The Magic Valley Cowboys competed at the Class C level (1952–58, 1961–62), the Class A level (1963), and the Rookie level (1964–66, 1968–71). At different times, they were affiliated with four National League teams; the Chicago Cubs (1954–58), the Philadelphia Phillies (1961–63), the San Francisco Giants (1964–66), and the Atlanta Braves (1968–70).

Magic Valley's one league championship came in 1955, when the Cowboys finished the regular season in fourth place, then defeated the Boise Braves and the Pocatello Bannocks in the playoffs.

Season records

All-stars

Notable alumni

 Dick Allen
 Larvell Blanks
 Ron Bryant
 Ken Henderson
 Alex Johnson
 Grady Little
 Mike Marshall
 Jerry Remy
 Mickey Rivers
 Al Zarilla

See also
Magic Valley Cowboys players

References

Further reading

Baseball teams established in 1952
Defunct Pioneer League (baseball) teams
Professional baseball teams in Idaho
Chicago Cubs minor league affiliates
Philadelphia Phillies minor league affiliates
San Francisco Giants minor league affiliates
Atlanta Braves minor league affiliates
1952 establishments in Idaho
Defunct baseball teams in Idaho
Baseball teams disestablished in 1971